Tohoku may refer to:

 Tōhoku region, Japan
 Tōhoku, Aomori, Japan, a town
 Tohoku University, Japan
 Grothendieck's Tôhoku paper, a mathematics paper sometimes referred to as 'Tohoku'
 2011 Tōhoku earthquake and tsunami, which affected the Tohoku region

See also